Julie Ann Giroux (born December 12, 1961 in Fairhaven, Massachusetts) is an American pianist and composer of orchestral, choral, chamber, and numerous concert band works.

Biography 
Giroux graduated from Ouachita Parish High School, in Monroe, Louisiana and earned a Bachelor of Music in Performance from Louisiana State University in Baton Rouge, Louisiana. During her college years, Giroux composed several concert band works which were published by Southern Music Company. Immediately after graduation she traveled to Los Angeles, California and began orchestrating under the employ of American composer Bill Conti for the Television Mini Series North and South. While in Los Angeles Giroux studied with several composers and orchestrators including Bill Conti, Jack Eskew and Greg McRitchie.

From 1985 to 1997, Julie Giroux orchestrated for television and films including April Fool's Day, Dynasty, North and South, North and South Book II, The Karate Kid Part II, Broadcast News, Masters of the Universe, White Men Can't Jump, and Blaze.

In 1997, Giroux began to compose heavily for concert bands and orchestras publishing exclusively with Musica Propria. In 2004 Gia Publications, Inc. published the book entitled "Composers on Composing for Band, Volume Two" which features a chapter written by Julie Giroux. Her insightful chapter gives a down to earth description which is often humorous of her personal methods and techniques for composing for bands.

In 2009, Giroux, an accomplished pianist, performed her latest work Cordoba for Solo Piano and Concert Band in five U.S. cities and attended the premiere of Arcus IX, a work for Solo F Tuba and Concert Band at Blinn College in Brenham, Texas.

Her 2009 Film and documentary orchestrations and compositions include the ongoing project "Call for Green China" which primarily funded by World Bank was recorded, performed and broadcast live in China in 2007. In 2009 the project was extended with new musical material, recorded and set to tour seven cities in China where the show will be performed live.

Giroux's Symphony No. V "Elements" by the Eastern Wind Symphony, featuring Conductor Todd Nichols premiered on June 9, 2018.  Her trumpet concerto commissioned by Conductor Ray Cramer, The Musashino Academia Musicae and principal trumpet Christopher Martin (trumpeter) of the New York Philharmonic premiered by the commissioners at The Midwest Clinic in December 2018.

An advocate of gun control and mental health awareness, Mrs. Giroux composed the work My Soul to Keep as a way to fight violence with music. In addition to its poignant lyrics and music, Giroux has made the work "Free, for everybody, forever". She has created several different settings, from acapella SATB choir to symphonic band with choir. Orchestral and vocal arrangements will also be added. The premiere took place in Orlando, Florida, the place of the second largest mass shooting in the U.S., with the National LGBT Pride Symphonic Band on October 13, 2019. The next large concert will be in Las Vegas, Nevada in October 2020, the site of the largest mass shooting in American history. The free music may be downloaded on her website.My Soul to Keep

Giroux is a Member of American Bandmasters Association (ABA)and an honorary brother of the Omicron chapter of Kappa Kappa Psi at West Virginia University. She was initiated into the fraternity on April 2, 2005 and in December, 2017 she was awarded the Distinguished Service to Music Medal.

Julie Giroux currently resides in Madison, Mississippi and continues to compose, orchestrate and arrange for television, movies, video games, wind bands and orchestras.

Published compositions 
Giroux's concert works are published by Musica Propria and Southern Music Company. Most have been recorded by Mark Custom Recordings,
  Fontec, Klavier, and Naxos.
Numerous United States Military Band recordings include her works. Those compact discs can be obtained by contacting the appropriate military band or purchased through various labels. All of the Concert Band/Wind Ensemble listed works are Published and most can be listened to at Giroux's official website.

Orchestra 
 Fort McHenry Suite
 The Rockets Red Glare
 Dimly Seen Through the Mists of the Deep
 Freemen Shall Stand
 Arcus IX
 La Mezquita de Cordoba
 Moorish Piano Concerto for Piano and Orchestra in Four Movements

Concert band and wind ensemble 

 A Time to Dance
 All Good Things
Always
 Amaranthine
 Arcus IX (for solo f tuba and band)
 Autumn Rose (2017)
 Before the Sun (2013)
 Boston Liberties (2009)
 Carnaval! (2013)
 Celestial Seas (2014)
 Chorale for Wind Band & Melodic Percussion (2016)
 Circus Franticus
 Cordoba (for solo piano and band)2009
 Crown of Thorns
 Dragon Sky (2017)
 Dream Dancer
 Empire
 Fantasie in French
 Field of Dreams (2019)
 Fort McHenry Suite
 Freedom Rising
 Glenbury Grove
 Glorious Light
 (The)Grace in Being (2013)
 Hands of Mercy
 HardDrive (2010)
 Husaria Cavalry Overture
 Hymn for the Innocent (2017)
 Il Burlone
 I'll Be Home A'fore Ye
 Imbizo
 Impressions (2017)
 In My Father's Eyes (female voices & Wind Band)(2017)
 Italian Rhapsody (2009)
 J (2017)
 Journey Through Orion
 Just Flyin' (2016)
 K2 (2012)
 Kalanu
 KHAN (2008)
 La Mezquita de Cordoba (2007)
 Legacy
 Let Your Spirit Sing
 Louisiana Parish Sketches
 Mambo Perro Loco
 March of the Sun Dried Tomatoes
 Medalist Fanfare & Celebration (2014)
 Movin' On Down the Line
 Mystery on Mena Mountain (1979)
 No Man's Land (2017)
 Nothing That Is
 Of Blood & Stone: The Pyramids of Giza (2015)
 One Life Beautiful (2010)
 OPA! (2017)
 Ouachita
 Our Cast Aways (2018)
 Outlander (2009)
 Overture in Five Flat
 Paprikash (2014)
 Poseidon
 Primality!
 Prisoner of the Ring (1984)
 Riften Wed (2014)
 Shadow Falls (2013)
 Shine (2017)
 Space Symphony
 Strathcona Suite
 Swashbuckler
 The Ash Grove (2019)
 The Bonsai Tree (2010)
 The Hearthstone (2016)
 The Grace in Being (2015-2017)
 The Greatest Generation
 The Nature of the Beast
 The Necromancer
 The Speed of Heat (2011)
 Three Fanfares
 Tiger Tail March
 To Walk With Wings
 Trillium
 Twelve Gallon Hat (2013)
 Under the Willow (2015)
 Vigils Keep
 Vortex (2016)
 Wagon Trail
 West Wind Overture
 What Goes in the Night
 When Country Comes to Town
 Where the Red Fern Grows (2016)

Symphonies for concert band and wind ensemble 

 Symphony No. I Culloden (3 Movements)
 Heilan Lochs, Bairns & Heather
 I Hae Grat for Tho' I Kend
 We Toomed Our Stoops for the Gaudy Sodgers
 Symphony No. II No Finer Calling (3 Movements)
 Integrity March
 Far From Home
 Honor Above All
 Symphony No. III A Symphony of Fables (5 Movements)
 The Lion and the Mouse
 The Pied Piper of Hamelin
 The Tortoise and the Hare
 The Ugly Duckling
 The Three Billy Goats Gruff
 Symphony No. IV Bookmarks from Japan  (composed in 2013 - 6 Movements)
 Mount Fuji - "Fuji-san"
 Nihonbashi -  "Market Bridge"
 The Great Wave off Kanagawa - "The Life of One Wave"
 Kinryuzan Temple in Asakusa - "Thunder Gate"
 Evening Snow at Kambara - "Light is the Touch"
 Hakone - "Drifting"
 Symphony No. V  ELEMENTS - (composed in 2017-2018 - 3 Movements)
 Sun
 Rain
 Wind

Arrangements 

 Silent Night in Gotham
 A Stocking Full of Composers
 Christmas with Mozart
 O Holy Night (arrangement for solo soprano and band)
 Nearer My God to Thee
 Christmas & Sousa Forever!
 Peter Patapan
 The Little Bolero Boy
 Hark! Those Jingle Bells are Smokin'
 Merrily on High
 All Through the Night
 The First Noel
 The 12 Days of Christmas
 What Child is Ringing those Bells?
 I Got Rhythm, for Christmas
 Jingle them Bells
 Three Wise Guys
 Away in the Manger
 Christmas Toons
 One Torch, Two Women, Three Ships and Men Rejoicing
 The Blue Danube Christmas Waltz
 I'll Be Home for Christmas (Brass Feature)
 A Very Merry Heart & Soul
 Nutcracker Fantasia
 Concerto in F Minor, Op. 8, No. 4(RV297), "L'inverno" 1st Movement (Winter)- Vivaldi (Woodwind Feature)
 Drummer Boy Charlie (Percussion & Rhythm Feature)

Recordings 
 The Music of Julie Giroux
 Released by Mark Masters in 2010, recorded by the University of Texas at El Paso Wind Symphony with Ron Hufstader conducting.
 Julie Giroux Presents "Concert Band Christmas Gone Crazy"
 Released by Mark Masters in 2011, recorded by the University of Texas at El Paso Wind Symphony with Ron Hufstader conducting.
 Jingle them Bells - Christmas Favorites Re-imagined by Julie Giroux
 Released by Klavier, Distributed by Naxos -  UPC:019688704322, Item Number: K 77043, Release Date: Oct 30, 2012. Performed by the University of North Texas Symphonic Band, Dennis Fisher conducting.
 A Few Notes Between Friends - The Music of Julie Giroux
 Released by Klavier, Distributed by Naxos -  Released: Nov 11, 2014℗ 2014 Klavier. Performed by the University of North Texas Symphonic Band, Dennis Fisher, Paula Crider, Bruce Gilkes, Brendan Hagan, Bill Conti, Ray Cramer, Lowell Graham, Alan Sierichs & Julie Giroux conducting.
 SHINE - Julie Giroux
 Released by Klavier, Distributed by Naxos - Released April 20, 2018. Performed by the University of North Texas Symphonic Band, Dennis Fisher Conducting. Bruce Leeks Recording Engineer.
 ELEMENTS - Julie Giroux - The Eastern Wind Symphony
Audio CD - August 9, 2019, Label: Mark Records, ASIN: B07T4N5BG3

References

External links 
 The Music of Julie Giroux Julie Giroux's Official Website
 Musica Propria Julie Giroux's Publisher
 Julie Giroux on IMDB The Internet Movie Database (IMDB)
 Julie Giroux on Soundcloud The Music of Julie Giroux on Soundcloud
 Has recordings of Giroux's music Mark Custom Recording Service
 Publisher of Composers on Composing for Band Vol.II GIA Publications, Inc.
 The CD "The Music of Julie Giroux" Amazon
 The CD "Julie Giroux Presents - Concert Band Christmas Music Gone Crazy" Amazon
 The CD "Julie Giroux Presents - Concert Band Christmas Music Gone Crazy" iTunes
 The CD "Jingle Them Bells" Amazon
 The CD "Jingle Them Bells" iTunes
 The CD "Giroux: Shine" Amazon
 The Cd "Giroux:Shine" itunes
 The CD "Giroux: Elements - The Eastern Wind Symphony Amazon
 The Cd "Giroux: Elements - The Eastern Wind Symphony itunes

1961 births
21st-century classical composers
American women classical composers
American classical composers
American music arrangers
Concert band composers
Emmy Award winners
Living people
Louisiana State University alumni
Musicians from Monroe, Louisiana
Texas classical music
People from Fairhaven, Massachusetts
20th-century classical composers
21st-century American composers
20th-century American women musicians
20th-century American composers
21st-century American women musicians
Classical musicians from Massachusetts
20th-century women composers
21st-century women composers